Sketch-based modeling is a method of creating 3D models for use in 3D computer graphics applications.  Sketch-based modeling is differentiated from other types of 3D modeling by its interface - instead of creating a 3D model by directly editing polygons, the user draws a 2D shape which is converted to 3D automatically by the application.

Purpose 
Many computer users think that traditional 3D modeling programs such as Blender or Maya have a high learning curve.  Novice users often have difficulty creating models in traditional modeling programs without first completing a lengthy series of tutorials.  Sketch-based modeling tools aim to solve this problem by creating a User interface which is similar to drawing, which most users are familiar with.

Uses 
Sketch-based modeling is primarily designed for use by persons with artistic ability, but no experience with 3D modeling programs. However, sketch-based modeling is also used for other applications.  One popular application is rapid modeling of low-detail objects for use in prototyping and design work.

Operation 
There are two main types of sketch-based modeling.  In the first, the user draws a shape in the workspace using a mouse or a tablet.  The system then interprets this shape as a 3D object.  Users can then alter the object by cutting off or adding sections.  The process of adding sections to a model is generally referred to as overdrawing.  The user is never required to interact directly with the vertices or Nurbs control points.

In the second type of sketch-based modeling, the user draws one or more images on paper, then scans in the images.  The system then automatically converts the sketches to a 3D model.

Research  
A great deal of research is currently being done on sketch-based modeling.  A number of papers on this topic are presented each year at the ACM SIGGRAPH conference.  The European graphics Association Eurographics sponsored four special conferences on sketch-based modeling: 

Grenoble 2004
Dublin 2005 
Vienna 2006 
Riverside 2007 

Since 2007, Eurographics and ACM SIGGRAPH have co-sponsored the Sketch-Based Interfaces and Modeling Symposium which in 2011 became a part of the Expressive Graphics Symposium

The Eurographics/SIGGRAPH Joint Symposium on Sketch-Based Interfaces and Modeling was held on
Annecy 2008 
New Orleans 2009
Jointly with NPAR at Annecy 2010
at Vancouver together with NPAR and Computational Aesthetics 2011

See also
 Digital sculpting
 Sketch recognition
 Sketch-Based Interfaces and Modeling
 Sketch-Based Modeling: A Survey
3D computer graphics